Ledinsko Razpotje (in older sources Veliko Razpotje) is a small settlement in the Municipality of Idrija in western Slovenia. Until 2009, the area was part of the settlements of Idršek and Pečnik. The settlement is part of the traditional region of Inner Carniola and is included in the Gorizia Statistical Region.

References

External links 

Ledinsko Razpotje on Geopedia

Populated places in the Municipality of Idrija
Populated places established in 2009
2009 establishments in Slovenia